The 1937 National Division was the first edition of the Turkish National Division. For the first time in Turkish football history the strongest clubs from the major regional leagues played against each other in a national league. Fenerbahçe won their first title.

Participants

Fenerbahçe - Istanbul Football League, 1st
Güneş - Istanbul Football League, 2nd
Galatasaray - Istanbul Football League, 3rd
Beşiktaş - Istanbul Football League, 4th
MKE Ankaragücü - Ankara Football League, 1st
Gençlerbirliği - Ankara Football League, 2nd
Üçok (an alliance between Altay, Altınordu, and Bucaspor) - İzmir Football League
Doğanspor (an alliance between Göztepe, İzmirspor, and Egespor) - İzmir Football League

League standings

Results

References
 Erdoğan Arıpınar; Tevfik Ünsi Artun, Cem Atabeyoğlu, Nurhan Aydın, Ergun Hiçyılmaz, Haluk San, Orhan Vedat Sevinçli, Vala Somalı (June 1992). Türk Futbol Tarihi (1904-1991) vol.1, Page(80), Türkiye Futbol Federasyonu Yayınları.

Turkish National Division Championship seasons
1936–37 in Turkish football
Turkey